Ken or Kenneth Summers may refer to:

 Ken Summers (darts player), retired English professional darts player
 Ken Summers (politician) (born 1953), Colorado legislator
 Kenneth J. Summers (born 1944), Canadian naval officer